Jiaomen may refer to:

Jiaomen Station, on Line 4, Guangzhou Metro, China
Jiaomen West Station, on Line 4 and Line 10, Beijing Subway, China
Jiaomen East Station, Line 10, Beijing Subway, China